Psalm 80 is the 80th psalm of the Book of Psalms, beginning in English in the King James Version: "Give ear, O Shepherd of Israel, thou that leadest Joseph like a flock". In the slightly different numbering system used in the Greek Septuagint and Latin Vulgate translations of the Bible, this psalm is Psalm 79. In Latin, it is known as "Qui regis Israel intende". It is one of the 12 Psalms of Asaph. The New American Bible (Revised Edition) calls it "a prayer for Jerusalem". The Jerusalem Bible describes it as "a prayer for the restoration of Israel".

The psalm forms a regular part of Jewish, Catholic, Lutheran, Anglican and other Protestant liturgies. It has been set to music, by composers including John Bennet and Heinrich Schütz, and notably Albert Roussel who composed an extended setting in English for tenor, choir and orchestra, completed in 1928.

Text

Hebrew Bible version
The following is the Hebrew text of Psalm 80:

King James Version
The following is the English text of the Psalm from the King James Bible.
 To the chief Musician upon ShoshannimEduth, A Psalm of Asaph.
 Give ear, O Shepherd of Israel, thou that leadest Joseph like a flock; thou that dwellest between the cherubims, shine forth.
 Before Ephraim and Benjamin and Manasseh stir up thy strength, and come and save us.
 Turn us again, O God, and cause thy face to shine; and we shall be saved.
 O LORD God of hosts, how long wilt thou be angry against the prayer of thy people?
 Thou feedest them with the bread of tears; and givest them tears to drink in great measure.
 Thou makest us a strife unto our neighbours: and our enemies laugh among themselves.
 Turn us again, O God of hosts, and cause thy face to shine; and we shall be saved.
 Thou hast brought a vine out of Egypt: thou hast cast out the heathen, and planted it.
 Thou preparedst room before it, and didst cause it to take deep root, and it filled the land.
 The hills were covered with the shadow of it, and the boughs thereof were like the goodly cedars.
 She sent out her boughs unto the sea, and her branches unto the river.
 Why hast thou then broken down her hedges, so that all they which pass by the way do pluck her?
 The boar out of the wood doth waste it, and the wild beast of the field doth devour it.
 Return, we beseech thee, O God of hosts: look down from heaven, and behold, and visit this vine;
 And the vineyard which thy right hand hath planted, and the branch that thou madest strong for thyself.
 It is burned with fire, it is cut down: they perish at the rebuke of thy countenance.
 Let thy hand be upon the man of thy right hand, upon the son of man whom thou madest strong for thyself.
 So will not we go back from thee: quicken us, and we will call upon thy name.
 Turn us again, O LORD God of hosts, cause thy face to shine; and we shall be saved.

Commentary
This psalm is classified as a 'communal lament'. Northern Israel is its main concern, so it may come from the period towards the end of the northern kingdom, although the Jerusalem Bible suggest that "it could apply equally well ... to Judah after the sack of Jerusalem in 586 BC".

Some links have been traced to Isaiah, with a 'similar image of a vineyard whose wall God breaks down' (Isaiah 5:1–7), also to Jeremiah and Ezekiel, who both refer to YHWH as shepherd, although the exact phrase 'Shepherd of Israel' is unique in this psalm.

The existence of a refrain (verses 3, 7, 19) is unusual, and the first two mark off the first two parts of the psalm, with the rest of the psalm forming a final section. The division is as follows:
 Verses 1–2: a call to God for help (refrain in verse 3)
 Verses 4–6: an urgent plea and complaint at God's treatment of his people (refrain in verse 7)
 Verses 8–13: a description of God's past care of Israel (with the figure of the vine alluding to the Exodus and conquest, and the present distress)
 Verses 14–17: a renewal of petition with a vow to return to God in verse 18, and a repetition of the refrain in verse 19.

Verse 17
Let Your hand be upon the man of Your right hand,
Upon the son of man whom You made strong for Yourself.
This verse probably alludes to Zerubbabel, who returned to Jerusalem in the first wave of liberated exiles under the decree of Cyrus the Great in 538 BC.

Uses

Judaism
This psalm is recited on the third day of Passover in some traditions, and on the second day of Sukkot in some traditions.

Christianity
This psalm is recited some days during Lent, as part of Lauds (Morning Prayer) of the  Divine Office.
In the Church of England's Book of Common Prayer, this psalm is appointed to be read on the morning of the 16th day of the month.

Musical settings 
John Bennet contributed Psalm 80 in English, Thou heard that Israel dost keepe, among a few others, to the 1621 colection The Whole Booke of Psalmes. Heinrich Schütz set the psalm in a metred version in German, "Du Hirt Israel, höre uns", SWV 177, as part of the Becker Psalter, first published in 1628.

Albert Roussel composed an extended setting in English for tenor, choir and orchestra, completed in 1928 and first performed the following year. Alan Hovhaness made an unpublished setting of this psalm in 1953 titled Shepherd of Israel for tenor, recorder (or flute), trumpet ad lib. & string quartet (or orchestra). Emil Naumann composed a choral work setting the psalm in German, Du Hirte Israels, höre, published in Berlin in 2003.

References

External links 

 
 
  in Hebrew and English, Mechon-mamre
 Text of Psalm 80 according to the 1928 Psalter
 For the leader; according to "Lilies." Eduth. A psalm of Asaph. Shepherd of Israel, lend an ear, you who guide Joseph like a flock! (text and footnotes) United States Conference of Catholic Bishops
 Psalm 80 – Restoring Israel, the Sheep and Vineyard of the LORD (text and detailed commentary) enduringword.com
 Psalm 80:1 (introduction and text) Bible study tools
 Psalm 80 / Hear, O Shepherd of Israel, you that led Joseph like a flock Church of England
 Psalm 80 Bible gateway
 Charles H. Spurgeon: Psalm 80 (commentary) spurgeon.org

080